The Kiribati Islands Football Association, formerly the Kiribati Islands Football Federation, is the governing body of football in Kiribati, established in 1980. It organises the nation's football league, the Kiribati National Championship, as well as controlling national men's, women's and futsal teams.

KIFA became a member of the Confederation of Independent Football Associations in ConIFA on May 6, 2016.

Staff

Tournaments
Kiribati National Championship
The KIFA organises the Kiribati football league in which clubs from all over the nation play each other.

References

National members of the Oceania Football Confederation
Football in Kiribati
Football
Sports organizations established in 1980